Government incentives for plug-in electric vehicles have been established around the world to support policy-driven adoption of plug-in electric vehicles. These incentives mainly take the form of purchase rebates, tax exemptions and tax credits, and additional perks that range from access to bus lanes to waivers on fees (charging, parking, tolls, etc.). The amount of the financial incentives may depend on vehicle battery size or all-electric range. Often hybrid electric vehicles are included. Some countries extend the benefits to fuel cell vehicles, and electric vehicle conversions.

More recently, some governments have also established long term regulatory signals with specific target timeframes such as ZEV mandates, national or regional  emissions regulations, stringent fuel economy standards, and the phase-out of internal combustion engine vehicle sales. For example, Norway set a national goal that all new car sales by 2025 should be zero emission vehicles (electric or hydrogen). Other countries have announced similar targets for the electrification of their vehicle fleet, most within a timeframe between 2030 and 2050.

Asia

China
On May 21, 2022, Shanghai Municipal People's Government released and issued the "Shanghai Action Plan for Accelerating Economic Recovery and Revitalization" to promote automobile consumption. The incentive plan includes tax deduction and offers financial subsidy of 10,000 Yuan per electrical vehicle.

The Chinese government adopted a plan in 2009 with the goal of turning the country into one of the leaders of all-electric and hybrid vehicles by 2012. The government's intention was to create a world-leading industry that would produce jobs and exports, and to reduce urban pollution and its oil dependence. However, a study found that even though local air pollution would be reduced by replacing a gasoline car with a similar-size electric car, it would reduce greenhouse gas emissions by only 19%, as China uses coal for 75% of its electricity production.

The Chinese government uses the term new energy vehicles (NEVs) to designate plug-in electric vehicles, and only pure electric vehicles and plug-in hybrid electric vehicles are subject to purchase incentives. On June 1, 2010, the Chinese government announced a trial program to provide incentives up to 60,000 yuan  (~ in June 2011) for private purchase of new battery electric vehicles and 50,000 yuan  (~ in June 2011) for plug-in hybrids in five cities. The cities participating in the pilot program are Shanghai, Shenzhen, Hangzhou, Hefei and Changchun. The subsidies are paid directly to automakers rather than consumers, but the government has stated that it expected that vehicle prices will be reduced accordingly. The amount of the subsidy is to be reduced once 50,000 units are sold. In addition to the subsidy, the Chinese government is planning to introduce, beginning on January 1, 2012, an exemption from annual taxes for pure electric, fuel-cell, and plug-in hybrid vehicles. Hybrid vehicles were eligible for a 50% reduction only.

In 2011, only 8,159 electric cars were sold in China despite a 120,000 yuan subsidy.
Unsubsidized lead-acid EVs are produced without government approval at a rate of more than 30,000 per year in Shandong and requires no driving license because the top speed is less than 50 km/h. They cost 31,600 yuan and have been the target of criticism from major car manufacturers.

A 2021 study found that China's subsidies for fuel efficient vehicles was not welfare enhancing, as "the marginal cost of the program exceeds the marginal benefit by as much as 300 percent."

The subsidies are part of the government's efforts to address China's problematic air pollution.

As a result of the government support and new incentives issued in 2014, production of new energy vehicles between January and August reached 31,137 units, up 328% from the same period of 2013. Domestic production during the first eight months of 2014 includes 6,621 plug-in hybrid sedans and 16,276 all-electric cars.

Additionally, to further electric vehicle production, China passed measures to greatly increase the number of electric vehicles on the road.  Original policy declared that companies with vehicles sales of over 30,000 vehicles must comply with new rules around NEVs.  Each company was required to fulfill a number of NEV credits, as much as 8% by the year 2018.  This target was later pushed to 2019, with a requirement of 12% by 2020.  These credits are granted by the fuel efficiency and weight of the vehicles, so more fuel efficient vehicles count for more credits.  Originally, these credits were granted according to the vehicles' range, however the final policy provided a more continuous way of determine credits.  The breakdown of credits in the original proposal are given below:

In the final policy, credits were instead given by the formula: (0.012 × electric range + 0.8) × adjustment factor.  These credits were capped at 6.  Additionally, these credits can be bought and sold.

In February 2018, to further promote energy-efficient electric vehicles, China raised subsidies for electric vehicles meeting additional range requirements.  Electric vehicle incentives for cars with at least 400 km of range increased from 44,000 yuan to 50,000 yuan, while vehicles with less than 150 km of range have been removed from the list of vehicles qualifying for an incentive.  Changes were also made to the incentive structure for electric buses and trucks.  Buses are now required to have a range of at least 150 km and have energy consumption of less than 0.7 Wh/km·kg.

India

In November 2010, the Government of India (GoI), through the Ministry of New and Renewable Energy (MNRE), announced a subsidy of  million for electric vehicles. To claim the subsidy, manufacturers needed to certify that 30% of the components were made in India. The scheme ended on 31 March 2012.

In April 2014, the Indian government announced a new plan to provide subsidies for hybrid and electric vehicles. India aims to have seven million electric vehicles on the road by 2020.

There is no subsidy or incentive for hybrids and imported vehicles, which acts as a deterrent to new entrants. To meet the stated GoI objectives under the Paris Accord, the GoI has set deadline for 'Only Electric Vehicle (Manufacturing)' by 2030. Although highly ambitious as it may seem, there is growing recognition among policy makers to incentivise electric vehicle manufacturing under the 'Make In India ' policy, and a new framework policy for this was to be released by year end, 2017. Moreover, infrastructure for electric vehicle charging is also being considered; provided either through existing energy retailers like fuel pumps or by subsidising manufacturers' investments in the field.

Tesla Motors has been offered tax incentives and potential financial backing via Special Purpose Vehicles ('SPV's) to establish a domestic manufacturing unit in India. Although, there are local sourcing norms of 30%, electric vehicle entrants have been exempted. Yet much will depends on governments plan to subsidise the vehicle, due their high upfront cost,  that will determine any potential shift in the market.

According to an OECD report, India is regarded as a country providing the least subsidies, compared to other major markets, to renewable energy in electric vehicle and that may hamper the governments target of achieving the all-electric target by 2030.

Various state governments and cities provide their own subsidies:
 Delhi, Rajasthan, Uttarakhand and Lakshadweep don't levy VAT
 Chandigarh, Madhya Pradesh, Kerala, Gujarat & West Bengal offer partial rebate on VAT
 Delhi also provides a 15% subsidy of the base price of select electric cars, like REVA. It also exempts such cars from road tax and registration fees.

Japan

The Japanese government introduced the first electric vehicle incentive program in 1996, and it was integrated in 1998 with the Clean Energy Vehicles Introduction Project, which provided subsidies and tax discounts for the purchase of electric, natural gas, methanol and hybrid electric vehicles. The project provided a purchase subsidy of up to 50% the incremental costs of a clean energy vehicle as compared with the price of a conventional engine vehicle. This program was extended until 2003.

In May 2009 the National Diet passed the "Green Vehicle Purchasing Promotion Measure" that went into effect on June 19, 2009, but retroactive to April 10, 2009. The program established tax deductions and exemptions for environmentally friendly and fuel efficient vehicles, according to a set of stipulated environmental performance criteria, and the requirements are applied equally to both foreign and domestic produced vehicles. The program provides purchasing subsidies for two type of cases, consumers purchasing a new passenger car without a trade-in (non-replacement program), and for those consumers buying a new car trading a used car registered for 13 years or more (scrappage program).

Tonnage and acquisition tax reductions

New next generation vehicles, including electric and fuel cell vehicles, plug-in hybrids, hybrid electric vehicles, clean diesel and natural gas vehicles are exempted from both the acquisition tax and the tonnage tax. Acquisition taxes on used vehicles were to be reduced by 1.6% to 2.7%, or between 150,000 yen (~US$1,600) and 300,000 yen (~US$3,200), as of 2010. Electric and fuel cell vehicles have a 2.7% reduction while plug-in hybrids have a 2.4% reduction.

These incentives were effective from April 1, 2009, until March 31, 2012, for the acquisition tax which is paid once at the time of purchase. The tonnage tax reductions were effective from April 1, 2009, until April 30, 2012, and the incentive was applicable once, at the time of the first mandatory inspection, three years after the vehicle purchase. As an example, the amount exempted for the purchase of a new next generation vehicle was 81,000 yen (~US$975) corresponding to the acquisition tax, and 22,500 yen (~US$271) for the tonnage tax, for a total of 103,500 yen (~US$1,246).

Automobile tax reductions
Consumers purchasing new next generation electric vehicles, including fuel cell vehicles, benefited from a 50% reduction of the annual automobile tax. These incentives were in effect from April 1, 2009, until March 31, 2010, applicable only once.

Incentives for purchasing new green vehicles
Subsidies for purchases of new environmentally friendly vehicles without scrapping a used car are 100,000 yen (~US$1,100) for the purchase of a standard or small car, and 50,000 yen (~US$550) for the purchase of a mini or kei vehicle. Subsidies for purchasing trucks and buses meeting the stipulated fuel efficiency and emission criteria vary between 200,000 yen (~US$2,100) to 900,000 yen (~US$9,600).

Subsidies for purchases of new environmentally friendly vehicles in the case of owners scrapping a 13-year or older vehicle are 250,000 yen (~US$2,700) for the purchase of a standard or small car, and 125,000 yen (~US$1,300) for the purchase of a mini or kei vehicle. Subsidies for purchasing trucks and buses meeting the stipulated fuel efficiency and emission criteria vary between 400,000 yen (~US$4,300) to 1,800,000 yen (~US$19,000).

All incentives for new purchases with or without trading were applicable in Japan's fiscal year 2009, from April 1, 2009, through March 31, 2010.

Philippines
Under President Duterte's administration, the Tax Reform for Acceleration and Inclusion Act was signed into law, which has exemptions for anyone buying an electric vehicle alongside hybrids.

South Korea 

In July 2016, the Ministry of Trade, Industry and Energy announced a plan to make electric car batteries run longer, build a network of charging stations and make electric car purchases and ownership more affordable. The government expects that the current and future policy programs will help increase the electric car market share in South Korea to 0.5% in 2017, up from 0.2% in 2015, and to achieve 5.3% in 2020.

The government subsidy has in place a one-time purchase subsidy for electric cars.  Effective July 8, 2016, the subsidy was increased to 14 million won from 12 million won. Also starting in 2016, the purchase tax surcharges of electric cars was planned to be reduced, and all-electric car drivers are projected to benefit from reductions in insurance premiums, expressway tolls and parking fees. The government plan calls for the deployment of fast charging stations in 2020 to be available at an average of one within a two-kilometer radius in the capital city of Seoul. In addition, 30,000 slow charging stations were planned to be strategically located at about 4,000 apartment complexes nationwide by 2020.

The government expects to increase the global market share of South Korean electric cars to match that of South Korean gasoline and diesel cars, which reached 8.5% based on sales by South Korea's two main car exporters, Hyundai Motor Company and Kia Motors.

Europe

Electrification of transport (electromobility) figures prominently in the Green Car Initiative (GCI), included in the European Economic Recovery Plan.

There are measures to promote efficient vehicles in the Directive 2009/33/EC of the European Parliament and of the Council of 23 April 2009 on the promotion of clean and energy-efficient road transport vehicles and in the Directive 2006/32/EC of the European Parliament and of the Council of 5 April 2006 on energy end-use efficiency and energy services.

As of April 2011, 15 of the 27 European Union member states provide tax incentives for electrically chargeable vehicles, which includes all Western European countries plus the Czech Republic and Romania. Also 17 countries levy carbon dioxide related taxes on passenger cars as a disincentive. The incentives consist of tax reductions and exemptions, as well as of bonus payments for buyers of PEVs, hybrid vehicles, and some alternative fuel vehicles.

Armenia 
Armenia advanced an initiative to exempt VAT taxes from the import of electric cars. On January 17, the government approved the draft on the initiative on the draft law, according to which "the import of electric motor vehicles will be exempt from value added tax. The exemption is supposed to be in effect until January 1, 2022".

Armenia is also set to become the first country, the government of which will switch its fleet from petroleum-run cars to all electric cars. As the Minister of Nature Protection has stated, the Armenia has joined the Global Electric Mobility process. The country has already been granted relevant funds for undertaking this project, and as the minister states "in case of everything proceeding swiftly, all Cabinet members will be issued electric cars by year-end".

Austria
Electric vehicles are exempted from the fuel consumption tax, levied upon the first registration, and from the monthly vehicle tax. In addition to tax breaks, hybrid vehicles and other alternative fuel vehicles benefit from a fuel consumption tax that pays bonuses to passenger cars with low carbon dioxide output. This bonus was valid from 1 July 2008 until 31 August 2012. Additionally, cars with no carbon emissions qualify for a deduction of the VAT (Value-Added Tax), as of January 2016.

Belgium
The Belgian government established a personal income tax deduction of 30% of the purchase price including VAT of a new electric vehicle, up to €9,190. Plug-in hybrids are not eligible. This tax incentive ended on December 31, 2012. There is also available a tax deduction up to 40% for investments in external recharging stations publicly accessible, to a maximum of €250. The Wallonia regional government had an additional  eco-bonus for cars registered before December 31, 2011.

Bulgaria

Electric vehicles, including cars, motorbikes and mopeds, are exempt from the annual circulation tax.

Cyprus 
Vehicles with emissions less than 120 grams of carbon dioxide per kilometer are exempt from paying registration taxes.

Czech Republic
Electric, hybrid and other alternative fuel vehicles used for business purposes are exempt from the road tax.

The Czech Republic has one of the lowest rates of plug-in electric vehicles on newly registered automobiles among OECD countries (only 0,3 % in 2018). It is becoming relevant topic for the country, especially for the Škoda auto, the Czech greatest representative of the automobile industry.

Hence, experimentally empirical research on Czech consumers’ preferences was conducted, whose aim was to evaluate the efficiency of various incentives that might promote the market with plug-in electric vehicles in the Czech Republic. The research has shown that except the price, the most relevant factors affecting the willingness to pay for the relatively expensive plug-in electric vehicles are: better fuel-efficiency (CZK 52,000 more on average for a reduction in operating costs of CZK 1 per 1 km for a new car), increase in driving range (CZK 28,000 more on average for an increase in driving range of 100 km), battery-charging time, financial support for electrical wiring in households, free parking in cities or environmental factors (26–40 thousand CZK for each 20% emission reduction). On the other hand, free motorway toll sticker or special traffic lane has non-significant effect on the incentives to buy the vehicle.

Denmark

In 2016, battery electric vehicles lost access to their registration tax exemption.  The registration tax will gradually be phased back in until 2020.  there are only 7,000 electric cars in Denmark. As of late 2018 another push for delay of the gradually phasing beyond the initial 20% of the normal up 150% registration tax is expected to pass with a wide majority resulting to final phase being pushed to 2023: This also includes even larger base registration deduction of 40K DDK in 2019 while keeping the 20% and increasing deduction to ~77K DKK in 2020 together with first big substantial increase to 40% of normal registration tax. This was an agreed minimum deal of improvements most parties could get behind due to the symbolic meaning that cars under 400K DKK including VAT (which itself has deductions for efficient cars) would experience the old full registration tax exception matching 2019–2020 delivers of the cheaper but long range models such as Tesla Model 3 LR, LEAF 60 kWh model and Hyundai Kona Electric 60 kWh model. These models could be argued being the first non-premium cars useful for the people with the longest daily drives which makes the close to or financial positive compared to cheap compacts. Until 2019 only premium cars, under much fuss due to the large per car exemptions, or short range users had a financial incentive alone to buy a full BEV instead of a mild Hybris. This 2018 push was after yet another round of discussions of even further incentives failed – a current split between moving too slowly and losing too much of the 57B DKK yearly income. 2018 law includes backstop moving from 5K to 10K cars sold since start of 2016 under this plan at which point incentives has to be revisited.

Estonia
No grants towards the purchase of Plug-In or Electric vehicles as of 2016. Electric vehicles are exempt from the city public parking fees and can use bus lanes.

The grant has helped the purchase of over 650 electric cars in Estonia. At that time, a country-wide quick charging network (CHAdeMO 500 V/120 A and Type2 400 V/32 A) was established.

Finland
For the period of 2018–2021, €6,000,000 annually will be allocated towards the purchase of electric cars and conversion of petrol cars to E85 and gas. An individual registering a new electric car in the period 1.1.2018–30.11.2021 is eligible for a grant of €2,000, if the purchase price of the car is €50,000 or less.

The Prime Minister of Finland (2003–2010) Mr. Matti Vanhanen in 2010 mentioned that he wanted to see more electric cars on Finnish roads as soon as possible and with any cost to the governmental car related tax incomes.

In the end of 2017, there were 1,449 electric cars registered in Finland.

France

Since 2008 France has a bonus–malus system offering a financial incentive, or bonus, for the purchase of cars with low carbon emissions, and a fee, or malus, for the purchase of high-emission vehicles. The bonus applies to private and company vehicles purchased on or after 5 December 2007 and are deduced from the purchase price of the vehicle. The malus penalty applies to all vehicles registered after 1 January 2008, and is added at the time of registration.

2012–2014

The incentive could not exceed 20% of the sales price including VAT, increased with the cost of the battery if it is rented.

Effective on August 1, 2012, the government increased the bonus for electric cars up to  but capped at 30% of the vehicle price including VAT. The price includes any battery leasing charges, and therefore, electric cars which need a battery leasing contract also are eligible for the bonus. The emission level for the maximum bonus was raised to 20 g/km or less.

The fee schedule for the bonus-malus was modified in 2013. Flex-fuel vehicles remained exempt from the malus fee. A neutral class applies to vehicles emitting between 91 and 130 g/km.

2015–2016

Also a specific  grant was introduced for families which are below the income tax threshold who buy an ordinary new or second hand car below certain  emission thresholds or a hybrid or electric car.

Effective January 4, 2016, the  bonus limited to 27% of the purchase price of vehicles emitting up to 20 g/km was kept. This bonus corresponds to pure electric vehicles and those equipped with a range extender. Vehicles emitting between 21 and 60 g/km are entitled to a  bonus. This bonus corresponds to the majority of plug-in hybrids. Conventional hybrid passenger cars emitting between 61 and 110 g/km with sufficient level of hybridization, with an electric motor with an output power of not be less than 10 kW, are entitle to a  bonus.

The combined  super-bonus for the purchase or lease of a new all-electric car was maintained. To be eligible for the additional scrappage bonus, the old diesel-powered car have to be owned for at least a year and in circulation before 1 January 2006.

Only individuals or professionals are eligible for the scrappage bonus. Commercial vehicles are not eligible. Neither demonstration vehicles are eligible to the superbonus unless the vehicles are sold or leased within one year following the date of first registration.

2017
, the government proposal to be in force from 1 January 2017 provides that the  super-bonus for scrapping a diesel vehicle over 10 years-old was planned to be renewed. Also, the government plans to introduce a purchase price cap to the vehicles eligible for the bonus, and to introduce a new bonus for two-wheeled motor vehicles.

The government intended to maintain the   purchase bonus for plug-in hybrids with a  emission level between 21 and 60 g/km. However, the proposal does not include anything about the conversion premium for scrapping a 10-year-old diesel car for the purchase of a plug-in hybrid. The purchase bonus for non-rechargeable hybrid vehicles was to be eliminated.

2020–2022 
French (Zoe, E208, C4, DS-3...)

Germany

"Nationale Plattform Elektromobilität" (NPE) is a German government initiative to develop Germany into a leading market for electric mobility. In May 2010, under its National Program for Electric Mobility, Chancellor Angela Merkel set the goal to bring 1 million electric vehicles on German roads by 2020. However, the government also announced that it would not provide subsidies to the sales of plug-in electric cars but instead it will only fund research in the area of electric mobility. Electric vehicles and plug-ins are exempt from the annual circulation tax for a period of five years from the date of their first registration. In 2016, the annual circulation tax exemption was extended from five to ten years, backdated to 1 January 2016.

The private use of a company car is treated as taxable income in Germany and measured at a flat monthly rate of 1% of the vehicle's gross list price. So plug-in electric cars have been at a disadvantage since their price tag can be as much as double that of a car using a conventional internal combustion engine due to the high cost of the battery. In June 2013 German legislators approved a law that ends the tax disadvantage for corporate plug-in electric cars. The maximum offset was set at  corresponding to a 20 kWh battery. The range criteria will rise to  starting in 2018. As part of the package of financial incentives approved in 2016, private owners of plug-in electric vehicles that charge their cars in their employer premises are exempted from declaring this perk as a cash benefit in their income tax return. Employers who provide this perk are allowed to discount from their income tax a 25% of the lump sum value of the cash benefit. These two fiscal benefits apply only from 1 January 2017 until the end of 2020.

In August 2014, the federal government announced its plan to introduce non-monetary incentives through new legislation to be effective by 1 February 2015. The proposed user benefits include measures to privilege battery-powered cars, fuel cell vehicles and some plug-in hybrids, just like Norway does, by granting local governments the authority to allow these vehicles into bus lanes, and to offer free parking and reserved parking spaces in locations with charging points.

According to the fourth progress report of the German National Electric Mobility Platform, only about 24,000 plug-in electric cars are on German roads by the end of November 2014, well behind the target of 100,000 unit goal set for 2014. As a result, Chancellor Angela Merkel recognized in December 2014 that the government has to provide more incentives to meet the goal of having 1 million electric cars on the country's roads by 2020. Among others, and based on the recommendations of the report, the federal government is considering to offer a tax break for zero-emission company cars, more subsidies to expand charging infrastructure, particularly to deploy more public fast chargers, and more public funding for research and development of the next generation of rechargeable batteries.

In order to meet the climate targets for the transport sector, in 2016 the government set the goal to have from 7 to 10 million plug-in electric cars on the road by 2030, and 1 million charging points available in Germany also by 2030.

Purchase incentive

2016–2019
, the German government proposal is for the auto industry to cover 40% of the cost of the purchase subsidy. Private buyers would get the full  subsidy, while corporate buyers would receive  for each electric car, and the program is expected to run until 2020, the deadline set to achieve the goal of 1 million electric cars on German roads. Incentives will fall by  each year. In March 2016, Nissan Europe announced its support to the green car incentive and its commitment to double the government's E-premium incentive when buying a Nissan electric car, with a reduction of the purchase price of the same amount of the subsidy. Nissan Center Europe CEO said "we remain convinced that the goal of one million electric cars by 2020 is still achievable." According to Nissan if from now on electric car sales double every year until 2020, it is still possible to achieve the government goal.

Another  are budgeted to finance the deployment of charging stations in cities and on autobahn highway stops. And another  would go toward purchasing electric cars for federal government fleets. The program is aimed to promote the sale of 400,000 electric vehicles. The cost of the purchase incentive is shared equally between the government and automakers. Only electric vehicles purchased after 18 May 2016 are eligible for the bonus and the owner must keep the new electric car at least nine months. The same rule applies for leasing.

, BMW, Citroën, Daimler, Ford, Hyundai, Kia, Mitsubishi, Nissan, Peugeot, Renault, Toyota, Volkswagen, and Volvo had signed up to participate in the scheme. The online application system to claim the bonus went into effect on 2 July 2016. , a total of 26 plug-in electric cars and vans are eligible for the purchase bonus. According to the Federal Office of Economics and Export Control (BAFA), a total of 4,451 applications have been made for the government subsidy for the purchase of a plug-in electric model , consisting of 2,650 all-electrics and 1,801 plug-in hybrids. , the federal states with the most claims are Bayern (1,130), Baden-Württemberg (873), and Nordrhein-Westfalen (726).

, the following 26 plug-in electric cars and vans are eligible for the purchase bonus: Audi A3 e-tron, BMW 225xe, BMW 330e, BMW i3, Citroën Berlingo Electric, Citroën C-Zero, Ford Focus Electric, Kia Soul EV, Mercedes-Benz B-Class Electric Drive (B 250e), Mercedes-Benz C350 e, Mitsubishi i-MiEV, Mitsubishi Outlander P-HEV, Nissan e-NV200 5- and 7-seater Combi, Nissan Leaf, Peugeot iOn, Peugeot Partner Electric, Renault Kangoo Z.E., Renault Zoe, Smart Fortwo electric drive, Tesla Model 3, Toyota Prius Plug-in Hybrid, Volkswagen e-Golf, Volkswagen e-Up!, Volkswagen Golf GTE, Volkswagen Passat GTE, and Volvo V60 Plug-in Hybrid.

2020–2021

As part of the stimulus plan, the purchase bonus for plug-in electric cars was raised by temporarily doubling the federal contribution of the environmental bonus until the end of 2021. This became the highest economic incentive granted in any European country, but there is a holding period, the vehicle must be registered in Germany for at least six months.

In addition, other tax incentives for electric vehicles were introduced.

Greece
From 2011 to June 2016, all electric vehicles were exempt from the registration tax. From 1 July 2016 onwards the registration tax for hybrid vehicles was reduced to 50%.

In June 2020, Greek Prime Minister Kyriakos Mitsotakis announced the government's plan to support the adoption of new battery electric vehicles (BEV) and plug-in hybrid electric vehicles (PHEV) by individuals and corporations, with the aim for one-in-three new vehicles in Greece to be electric by 2030. The plan includes purchase subsidizing, exemption from the road tax and any parking fees, as well as incentives for setting up charging stations, for pure electric private passenger cars and motorbikes, as well as for pure electric or plug-in hybrid taxis and light commercial vehicles. The government's subsidy covers the purchase of new BEVs and PHEVs with a total of 100 million euros for 18 months in the first phase, which is estimated to cover 25% of the cost of about 14.000 new electric vehicles.

The government will subsidize the purchase of each new electric vehicle, covering 15% of its cost (up to €5.500) for private passenger and light commercial vehicles, 20% of the cost (up to €800) for motorbikes and 25% of the cost (up to €8.000) for taxis. Vehicle owners that will concurrently retire their old vehicle will receive an additional bonus of up to €2.500. Furthermore, expenses for charging the electric car will be exempt from taxable income. The benefit for each new electric car, if combined with the ecological bonus and the relevant tax exemptions, will approach 10.000 euros.

Hungary
All hybrid and electric vehicles are exempt from registration tax. Furthermore, to promote electric cars, the Government has added some other regulatory incentives, such as green license plates, and simplified tax and regulations on electric charge points. By 2020, the Government expects that there will be 30,000 environmentally friendly cars on Hungarian roads.

Iceland

Electric vehicles, as well as hydrogen powered vehicles, that are shorter than 5 meters also get free parking in the city center for up to 90 minutes. The free parking also applies to methane and hybrid vehicles that weigh less than 1,600 kg, although in order for hybrid vehicles to be applicable, they must have  emissions of less than 50 g/km.

Ireland

Series production EVs were exempted from VRT until December 2012. The VRT exemption was replaced by a €5000 credit against the tax. Annual motor tax for EVs is €120. The Government has set a target of 10% for all vehicles on Irish roads to be electric by 2020.

The ESB eCar electric vehicle charging network serves as the main charging network for the island of Ireland and has rapidly expanded in recent years. Currently the network is free to use with an RFID card provided by ESB to EV owners who wish to use the network. The network aims to provide rapid charging every 30 km on major routes and as of 2015 has almost 2000 standard charging points (all provide connection via IEC 62196 Type 2 Mennekes, around half are 22 kW with the remainder a mix of 3.6 kW and 7.4 kW). There are around 100 CHAdeMO rapid chargers with over 70 located outside the Dublin Metro area. All rapid chargers installed since mid-2014 have been triple standard CHAdeMO/Combined Charging System/AC 43 kW. Four rapid chargers in Dublin and two rapid chargers in Belfast were co-funded by the EU as part of the UK/Ireland RCN program. The UK charging network operated by Ecotricity has a single CHAdeMO only rapid charger at IKEA Belfast. This is the sole rapid charger on the island that is not part of the ESB eCars network.

Sustainable Energy Authority of Ireland offers a government grant of up to €5,000 for the purchase of a new electric car. However this grant is only available on vehicles on an approved list of models  which must be sold by a dealer registered for the scheme. No grant applies where a vehicle is imported privately. The grant is reduced to €3,800 for business purchasers or those who require finance to purchase the vehicle, however some importers will report financed private sales as cash sales to acquire the full grant.

Also, all-electric car owners pay the lowest rate of annual road tax, which is based on emissions.

Italy
Electric vehicles are exempt from the annual circulation tax or ownership tax for five years from the date of their first registration. Thereafter, EVs benefit from a 75% reduction of the tax rate applied to equivalent gasoline-powered vehicles. Buyers of electric vehicles and other vehicles emitting 70 g/km or less of carbon dioxide are eligible to receive from €1,500 to €6,000. In the region of Lombardy, electric vehicles are exempt from the annual ownership tax.

Latvia 
Electric vehicles, including cars, goods vehicles, buses, and motorcycles, are exempt from payment of the Vehicle Operation Tax.

Luxembourg
In order to qualify for the rebate, the owner must have concluded an agreement to buy electricity from renewable energy.

Monaco
Buyers of electric vehicles and plug in hybrids are eligible to receive  (around ) from the Monegasque Government. In addition vehicles owners are allowed to park free at any public parking facility.

Netherlands

Considering the potential of plug-in electric vehicles in the country due to its relative small size and geography, the Dutch government set a target of 15,000 to 20,000 electric vehicles with three or more wheels on the roads in 2015; 200,000 vehicles in 2020; and 1 million vehicles in 2025. The first government target was achieved in 2013, two years earlier, thanks to the sales peak that occurred at the end of 2013. According to official figures, 30,086 plug-in electric vehicles with three or more wheels have been registered in the country through 31 December 2013.

Other vehicles including hybrid electric vehicles were also exempt from these taxes if they emit less than 95 g/km for diesel-powered vehicles, or less than 110 g/km for gasoline-powered vehicles. The exemption from the registration tax ended on January 1, 2014, and thereafter, all-electric vehicles pay a 4% registration fee and plug-in hybrids a 7% fee.

In addition, the national government offers through the Ministry of Infrastructure and the Environment a  subsidy on the purchase of all-electric taxis or delivery vans.

In Amsterdam EV owners also have access to parking spaces reserved for battery electric vehicles, so they avoid the current wait for a parking place in Amsterdam, which can reach up to 10 years in some parts of the city. Free charging is also offered in public parking spaces. EV owners in the city of Rotterdam are entitled to one year of free parking in downtown and enjoy subsidies of up to  if they install a home charger using green electricity. The city also introduced in 2014 a scrappage program to remove old polluting vehicles to improve air quality in the city. Rotterdam offers a  incentive for business buyers to replace the old vehicles with all-electric vehicles. The subsidy is only available to the first 5,000 applicants that buy an eligible vehicle before the end of December 2013.
With all of these incentives and tax breaks, plug-in electric cars have similar driving costs to conventional cars.

Initially, sales of plug-in electric car were lower than expected, and during 2012 the segment captured a market share of less than 1% of new car sales in the country. As a result of the end of the total exemption of the registration fee, the segment sales peaked at the end of 2013, and plug-in electric car sales reached a market share of 5.34% of new car sales in 2013.

Norway

The Parliament of Norway set the goal to reach 50,000 zero emission vehicles by 2018. Among the existing incentives, all-electric cars are exempt in Norway from all non-recurring vehicle fees, including purchase taxes, which are extremely high for ordinary cars, and 25% VAT on purchase, together making electric car purchase price competitive with conventional cars. As an example, by early 2013 the price of the top selling Nissan Leaf was 240,690 kroner (around ) while the purchase price of the 1.3-lt Volkswagen Golf was 238,000 Krone (about ). Electric vehicles are also exempt from the annual road tax, all public parking fees, and toll payments, as well as being able to use bus lanes.

Government officials reserved in 1999 the "EL" prefix for exclusive use of all-electric vehicles in order to be able to enforce on the road the benefits available to EVs. As the "EL" series is set to end at "EL 99999" (most vehicles in the country have five-digit registration numbers between 10000 and 99999), the Norwegian Public Roads agency opted for the prefix "EK" in the second series of plates, to signify "elektrisk kjøretøy", Norwegian for electric vehicle. And because the sale of electric vehicles is expected to continue at a rapid pace, meaning that the second phase of license plates is likely to run out as well, the "EV" prefix has been set aside for future electric cars. In July 2016, as the stock of "EL" prefix plates was almost depleted, the first electric vehicles registered with the new "EK" series were on the road.

Until June 2013, plug-in hybrids were not eligible for these benefits. Because the Norwegian tax system levies higher taxes for heavier vehicles, plug-in hybrids were more expensive than similar conventional cars due to the extra weight of the battery pack and its additional electric components. Beginning on 1 July 2013, the existing weight allowance for conventional hybrids and plug-in hybrids of 10% was increased to 15% for PHEVs.

In September 2013 the Norwegian Parliament approved, as part of the revised 2014 budget, an exemption from the 25% VAT for leasing electric vehicles effective on 1 January 2014. However, the exemption has not gone into effect because the Minister of Finance decided to defer the measure, pending a formal consultation with the EFTA Surveillance Authority (ESA) to ensure that the VAT exemption for leasing was not in violation of the European Economic Area Agreement. The government's loss of revenue due to the still not implemented leasing exemption is estimated at 47 million krone (around ) per year. One Member of Parliament has criticized the government for the delay. He had argued that the initial VAT exemption for all electric vehicles was never approved in ESA. In addition, an ESA spokesman confirmed that the Government has not sent any request , nor has ESA received any complaints about Norway's original EV tax exemption. The MP said he will demand that the decision be implemented when Parliament meets in October 2014.

The target of 50,000 electric cars on Norwegian roads was reached on 20 April 2015, more than two years earlier than expected. In early March 2015 negotiations began among parties represented in the Parliament to define the future of all motor vehicles and fuel taxes. The Liberal Party wanted all the benefits to continue beyond the established quota. The Ministry of Finance also made a comprehensive review of all motor vehicle taxes. The two purchase tax exemptions cost the government about 3 billion krone (around ) in lost revenue just in 2014, and up to 4 billion krone (around ) if all the other benefits are accounted for. Despite passing the established cap of 50,000 electric cars, the tax benefits were expected to continue at least until the end of 2016.

Phase out of incentives 

In May 2015 the Government decided to keep the existing incentives through 2017, and the political parties in Parliament agreed to reduced and phase out some of the incentives. Beginning in January 2018, electric car owners will be required to pay half of the yearly road license fee and the full rate as of 2020. The value-added tax (VAT) exemption for electric cars will end in 2018, but replaced by a new scheme, which may be subjected to a ceiling that could be reduced as technology develops. The agreement also gave local authorities the right to decide whether electric cars can park for free and use public transport lanes.

In March 2016, the Ministry of Transport issued new regulations for parking in locations with access to the general public. The new parking regulations, that go into effect on January 1, 2017, terminated the free parking for zero-emission vehicles, but established that Municipalities can introduce payment exemption for electric and hydrogen powered motor vehicles on municipal parking locations. , the city councils of Trondheim and Tønsberg decided to introduce full payment for EVs from 2017; the cities of Bodø and Tromsø will introduce payment for parking in downtown but exempted parking outside the city's center; and the cities of Oslo, Mandal and Drammen decided to keep free parking for zero-emission vehicles.

Portugal
The Portuguese Government launched in early 2008 a national Programme for Electric Mobility called Mobi.E.

Mobi.E is deploying a national electric mobility system. The system was designed to be scalable and used in multiple geographies, overcoming the current situation of lack of communication among the different electric mobility experiences that are being deployed in Europe. By the first semester of 2011, a wide public network of 1 300 normal and 50 fast charging points will be fully implemented in the main 25 cities of the country.

EVs are fully exempt from both the Vehicle Tax due upon purchase (Imposto Sobre Veículos) and the annual Circulation Tax (Imposto Único de Circulação). Personal income tax provides an allowance of EUR 803 upon the purchase of EVs. EVs are exempt from the 5%-10% company car tax rates which are part of the Corporation Income Tax. The Budget Law provides for an increase of the depreciation costs related to the purchase of EVs for the purpose of Corporation Income Tax.

Portugal established a government subsidy of €5,000 for the first 5,000 new electric cars sold in the country. In addition, there is in place a €1,500 incentive if the consumer turns in a used car as part of the down payment for the new electric car. Electric cars are also exempt from the registration tax.

Romania

, Romania offers a government grant of up to 25% of the price (up to a maximum of ) for the purchase of a new electric car. Furthermore, through the cash-for-clunkers program (scrappage program), those who wish to purchase an electric car will receive vouchers of over €5,000 total in return for their used car. Combined with the cash-for-clunkers program, the total grant is up to €2200.
Electric and hybrid vehicles are exempt from the environmental tax, which also acts as a registration tax.
From March 2015, electric vehicles are also exempt from the annual tax, while hybrid vehicles have a 95% reduction.

In 2017, the "Rabla Plus" grant program increased to EUR 10,000 for the purchase of a pure electric vehicle (BEV). Furthermore, car owners will receive an additional  if they end their registration of a car older than eight years.

Spain
Spain's government aimed to have 1 million electric cars on the roads by 2014 as part of a plan to cut energy consumption and dependence on expensive imports, Industry Minister Miguel Sebastián said.

In May 2011 the Spanish government approved a  fund for year 2011 to promote electric vehicles. The incentives include direct subsidies for the acquisition of new electric cars for up to 25% of the purchase price, before tax, to a maximum of €6,000 per vehicle (US$8,600), and 25% of the gross purchase price of other electric vehicles such as buses and vans, with a maximum of €15,000 or €30,000, depending on the range and type of vehicle. Several regional government grant incentives for the purchase of alternative fuel vehicles including electric and hybrid vehicles. In Aragón, Asturias, Baleares, Madrid, Navarra, Valencia, Castilla-La Mancha, Murcia, Castilla y León electric vehicles are eligible to a €6,000 tax incentive and hybrids to €2,000.

Sweden

There is also an exemption from the annual circulation tax for the first five years from the date of their first registration that benefits owners of electric vehicles with an energy consumption of 37 kWh per 100 km or less, and hybrid vehicles with  emissions of 120 g/km or less. In addition, for both electric and hybrid vehicles, the taxable value of the car for the purposes of calculating the benefit in kind of a company car under personal income tax is reduced by 40% compared with the corresponding or comparable gasoline- or diesel-powered car.

, a total of 5,028 new "super clean cars" had been registered in the country since January 2012, and because the government allocated funds for a total of 5,000 super clean cars between 2012 and 2014, the fund has been exhausted. BIL Sweden, the national association for the automobile industry, requested the government an additional  to cover the subsidy for another 2,500 registrations of new super clean cars between August and December 2014. The appropriation for 2015, according to the parliamentary decision and subsequent government decision, was to also be used for the retroactive payment of the super green cars registered in 2014 that did not receive the subsidy.

Beginning in 2016, only zero emissions cars are entitled to receive the full  premium, while other super green cars, plug-in hybrids, receive half premium. The exemption for the first five years of ownership from the annual circulation tax is still in place.

Two alternative proposals are being considered by the Swedish government regarding the introduction of a bonus-malus system. Both proposals entail changes to vehicle and car benefit taxation and the premium system for purchases of new cars. An official inquiry report was due by 29 April 2016. The goal is for the system to enter into force on 1 January 2017.
The new bonus-malus system, starting 1 July 2018, will offer electric car buyers a bonus of 60 000 SEK.
The bonus of SEK 70,000 offered to electric car buyers was abolished in November 2022 by the new right-wing government.

Switzerland
Switzerland has a car import tax which is 4% of the purchase price (before adding the VAT) which is waived for electric cars. Since Switzerland consists of 26 cantons which have their own legislature, additional incentives for plug-in electric vehicles differ between the respective regions. The current list can be downloaded from the website of the Swiss Department of Energy.

There are no additional incentives on the actual purchase price, but some cantons offer road tax cuts. The Swiss road tax is a yearly recurring fixed amount calculated based on the specifications of the tax payers car. Currently, only the cantons Glarus (GL), Solothurn (SO), Ticino (TI) and Zurich (ZH) are completely waiving the tax for plug-in electric vehicles.

Calculation example for Zurich

Based on a usual car with the following specification:
 Engine: 2 L
 Total weight: 1800 kg
 Energy efficiency: C
 Year: 2013

The resulting tax to be paid per year will be . Hence when calculating with a life expectancy of 10 years, the car owner in this example might save around  when buying a plug-in electric car.

However, since the tax on fossil fuels are relatively high in all European countries, including Switzerland, there is still an indirect, but quite strong incentive for car buyers to decide for energy efficient vehicles.

Based on the following examples:
 Fuel economy:  unleaded

United Kingdom

Plug-in Car Grant

The Plug-in Car Grant (PiCG) started on 1 January 2011 and is available across the UK. From 1 April 2015, the purchase price cap was raised to cover up to 35% discount of the vehicle's recommended retail price, up to the already existing  limit. This change means electric cars priced under  will be able to take advantage of most or all of the £5,000 discount. Both private and business fleet buyers are eligible for this grant, which is received at the point of purchase and the subsidy is claimed back by the manufacturer afterwards. The subsidy programme is managed in a similar way to the grant made as part of the 2009 Car Scrappage Scheme, allowing consumers to buy an eligible car discounted at the point of purchase with the subsidy claimed back by the manufacturer afterwards.

The government announced in April 2014 that funding for the full grant of up to  will remain in place until either 50,000 grants have been issued or 2017, whichever is first. As forecasts estimated that the scheme will reach its 50,000 limit around November 2015, the government announced in August 2015 that the Plug-in Car Grant will continue until at least February 2016 for all plug-in cars with  emissions of 75 g/km of under. The Government also announced that a minimum of   has been made available to continue the Plug-in Car Grant.

Vehicles eligible for the subsidy must meet the following criteria:
 Vehicle type: Only ultra-low emission cars are eligible (vehicle category M1).  Motorbikes, quadricycles and vans are not covered.
 Carbon dioxide exhaust emissions: Vehicles must emit equal or less than 75 grams of carbon dioxide per kilometre driven.
 Warranty: Vehicles must have a 3-year or  vehicle warranty (guarantee) and a 3-year battery and electric drive train warranty, with the option of extending the battery warranty for an extra 2 years('drive train' means the parts that send power from the engine to the wheels. These include the clutch, transmission (gear box), drive shafts, U-joints and differential).
 Battery performance: Vehicles must have either a minimum 5-year warranty on the battery and electric drive train as standard, or extra evidence of battery performance to show reasonable performance after 3 years of use
 Electrical safety: Vehicles must comply with certain regulations (UN-ECE Reg 100.01) that show that they are electrically safe.
 Crash safety: To make sure cars will be safe in a crash, they must either have: EC whole vehicle type approval (EC WVTA, not small series) or evidence that the car has appropriate levels of safety as judged by international standards.

In February 2015 the government announced that to take account of rapidly developing technology, and the growing range of ULEVs on the British market, the criteria for the plug-in car grant was updated and from April 2015, eligible ultra-low emission vehicles (ULEVs) must meet criteria in one of the following categories depending on emission levels and zero-emission-capable mileage, with a technology neutral approach, which means that hydrogen fuel cell cars are also eligible for the grant:
 Category 1:  emissions of less than 50g/km and a zero emission range of at least .
 Category 3:  emissions of 50–75g/km and a zero emission range of at least .

In December 2015, the Department for Transport (DfT) announced that Plug-in car grant was extended until March 2018 to encourage more than 100,000 UK motorists to buy cleaner vehicles. For the extension, the amount of the grant is linked in directly with the Office for Low Emission Vehicles three vehicle categories issued in April 2015. The eligible ultra-low emission vehicles (ULEVs) must meet criteria in one of three categories depending on emission levels ( emissions bands between 50 and 75g/km) and zero-emission-capable mileage (minimum of ), with a technology neutral approach, which means that hydrogen fuel cell cars are eligible for the grant. The updated scheme went into force on 1 March 2016.

Vehicles with a zero-emission range of at least  (category 1), including hydrogen fuel cell vehicles, get a full  (~), but plug-in hybrids (categories 2 and 3) costing under  (~) receive  (~). The grant scheme will come under review when a cumulative total of 40,000 Category 1 claims, and 45,000 Category 2 and 3 combined sales have been made. Both these totals will include cars sold before March 2016.

, the following 31 cars available in the British market are eligible for the grant according to their category:

Eligible category 1 vehicles
BMW i3, BYD e6, Citroen C-Zero, Ford Focus Electric, Hyundai Ioniq Electric, Kia Soul EV, Mahindra e2o, Mercedes-Benz B-Class Electric Drive, Nissan e-NV200 5- and 7-seater Combi, Nissan Leaf, Peugeot iOn, Renault Fluence Z.E., Renault Zoe, Smart Fortwo electric drive, Tesla Model S, Toyota Mirai, Volkswagen e-Golf, and Volkswagen e-Up!.

Eligible category 2 vehicles
Audi A3 e-tron (MY 2016 only), BMW 225xe, BMW 330e, Kia Optima PHEV, Mercedes-Benz C350 e, Mitsubishi Outlander P-HEV  (except GX3h 4Work), Toyota Prius Plug-in Hybrid, Vauxhall Ampera, Volkswagen Golf GTE, Volkswagen Passat GTE, Volvo V60 Plug-in Hybrid (D5 and D6 Twin Engine), and Volvo XC90 T8 Twin Engine Momentum.

Ineligible vehicles
Category 2 or 3 vehicles with a recommended retail price over £60,000 aren't eligible for a grant. This includes: BMW i8 (category 2), Mercedes-Benz S500 Plug-in Hybrid (category 3), and Porsche Panamera S E-Hybrid (category 3).

The Tesla Roadster was not included in the government's list of eligible vehicles for the plug-in electric car grant. Tesla Motors stated that the company applied for the scheme, but did not complete its application.

In 2018 the PICG was reduced from £4500 to £3500, and in March 2020 it was cut to £3000.

In addition to the extension of the Plug-in Grant, the government also announced it will continue the "Electric Vehicle Homecharge Scheme." Starting in March 2016 owners of ultra-low emission vehicles who install a dedicated charge point at their home, covering roughly half the average cost, will get  (~) towards the cost of installing the charging point, rather than the previous  (~) maximum.

Plug-in Van Grant

The Plug-In Van Grant (PiVG) began in February 2012. Van-buyers can receive 20% – up to  – off the cost of a plug-in van. To be eligible for the scheme, vans have to meet performance criteria to ensure safety, range, and ultra-low tailpipe emissions. Consumers, both business and private will receive the discount at the point of purchase. The government also announced their commitment for an additional  to the scheme so that all vans and trucks meeting the eligibility requirements can benefit from the grant scheme. The extension of the Plug-In Van grant means that N2 vans (3.5 – 12 tonnes gross weight) and N3 vans (over 12 tonnes gross weight) are now eligible.
 
The eligibility criteria for vans with a gross weight of 3.5 tonnes or less (N1 van) are:

 Vehicle type: only new N1 vans are eligible. This includes pre-registration conversions (normal, internal combustion engine vans that were converted to battery or hybrid versions by specialist converters before the car's first registration).
 Carbon dioxide exhaust emissions: vehicles must emit less than 75 grams of carbon dioxide per kilometre driven.
 Warranty: Vehicles must have a 3-year or  vehicle warranty (guarantee) and a 3-year battery and electric drive train warranty, with the option of extending the battery warranty for an extra 2 years
 Battery performance: vehicles must have either a minimum 5-year warranty on the battery and electric drive train as standard
or extra evidence of battery performance to show reasonable performance after 3 years of use
 Electrical safety: vehicles must comply with certain regulations (UN-ECE Reg 100.00) that show that they are electrically safe.
 Crash safety To make sure cars will be safe in a crash, they must either have EC whole vehicle type approval (EC WVTA, not small series) or evidence that the car has appropriate levels of safety as judged by international standards.

, the number of claims made through the Plug-in Van Grant scheme totaled 2,938 units since the launch of the programme in 2012, up from 1,906 made by the end of December 2015.  the following nine vans are eligible for the grant: BD Otomotive eTraffic, BD Otomotiv eDucato, Citroën Berlingo, Mercedes-Benz Vito E-Cell, Mitsubishi Outlander GX3h 4Work, Nissan e-NV200, Peugeot ePartner, Renault Kangoo Z.E., and Smith Electric Edison.

Number of beneficiaries

The number of eligible registered plug-in electric vehicles passed the 25,000 unit milestone in January 2015. , the number of eligible registered plug-in electric cars that have benefited with the subsidy totaled 94,541 units since the launch of the programme in 2011. , the number of claims made through the Plug-in Van Grant scheme totaled 2,938 units since the launch of the programme in 2012. About 90,000 plug-in electric vehicles have been registered in the UK up until December 2016, including over 85,000 plug-in hybrids and all-electric cars, and about 4,000 plug-in commercial vans. Not all vehicles were eligible for the grant schemes.

Plugged-in Places
On 19 November 2009, Andrew Adonis, the Secretary of State for Transport, announced a scheme called "Plugged-in-Places", making available £30 million to be shared between three and six cities to investigate further the viability of providing power supply for electric vehicles, and encouraging local government and business to participate and bid for funds.

The UK government is supporting the "Plugged-In Places" program to install vehicle recharging points across the UK. The scheme offers match-funding to consortia of businesses and public sector partners to support the installation of EV recharging infrastructure in lead places across the UK. There are eight Plugged-In Places:East of England; Greater Manchester; London; Midlands; Milton Keynes; North East;

 Northern Ireland; and Scotland. The Government also published an Infrastructure Strategy in June 2011.

London congestion charge
All-electric vehicles (BEVs) and eligible plug-in hybrid electric vehicles (PHEVs) qualify for a 100% discount from the London congestion charge. A plug-in electric drive vehicle qualifies if the vehicle is registered with the Driver and Vehicle Licensing Agency (DVLA) and has a fuel type of 'electric', or alternatively, if the vehicle is a 'plug-in hybrid' and is on the Government's list of PHEVs eligible for the OLEV grant.

The original Greener Vehicle Discount was substituted by the Ultra Low Emission Discount (ULED) scheme that went into effect on 1 July 2013. The ULED introduced more stringent emission standards that limited the free access to the congestion charge zone to any car or van that emits 75g/km or less of CO2 and meets the Euro 5 emission standards for air quality.  there are no internal combustion-only vehicles that meet this criteria. The measure is designed to limit the growing number of diesel vehicles on London's roads. Mayor Boris Johnson approved the new scheme in April 2013, after taking into account a number of comments received during the 12-week public consultation that took place. About 20,000 owners of vehicles registered for the Greener Vehicle Discount by June 2013 were granted a three-year sunset period (until 24 June 2016) before they have to pay the full congestion charge.

Effective from 8 April 2019, the ULED scheme will be replaced with the Cleaner Vehicle Discount. A further phase from October 2021 will mean that only zero-emission vehicles (pure electric vehicles and hydrogen fuel cell vehicles) will qualify for the discount, which will be phased out completely from December 2025.

North America

Canada

The Government of Canada introduced a federal Incentive for Zero Emission Vehicles (iZEV) program on May 1, 2019.

Simultaneously, the federal government launched a federal Zero-Emission Vehicle Infrastructure Program administered by Natural Resources Canada. The program provides rebates to businesses and governments for new electric vehicle charging stations in public places, workplaces, multi-family residential buildings, and in public transit and delivery fleets.

Ontario

Former rebate program
The Ontario Ministry of Transportation (MTO) established the Electric Vehicle Incentive Program (EVIP) – later renamed the Electric and Hydrogen Vehicle Incentive Program (EHVIP) – in 2010. To qualify, Battery Electric Vehicles (BEVs) and Plug-In Hybrid Electric Vehicles (PHEVs) had to be purchased or leased from a seller in Ontario and owned or leased for at least 12 months. Leased vehicles with 12-month terms received 33% of the incentive, 24-month lease terms received 66%, and lease terms 36 months or longer received the full incentive. Vehicles with five or more seats were eligible for an additional . Demonstration vehicles under a specified mileage and used exclusively for test drives at dealerships or leasing companies were also eligible. Applications for incentives were required to be submitted within 3 months of the vehicle's provincial registration. The EHVIP was financed by proceeds from Ontario's participation with Quebec and California in the Western Climate Initiative (WCI) cap and trade program.

The program (and the companion incentive program to encourage private businesses to install charging stations) was cancelled on July 11, 2018, after the government of Premier Doug Ford began the withdrawal of Ontario from the WCI. Rebates were still issued if the vehicle had been delivered to the consumer, registered, and plated on or before July 11; or if the vehicle was in the inventory of a dealership on or before July 11 or was ordered directly from the manufacturer before that date, provided that the vehicle was delivered to the consumer, registered, and plated by September 10, 2018.

Green vehicle plates

Electric vehicles in Ontario are eligible for special license plates, officially called Green Vehicle License Plates, from the Ministry of Transportation. In addition to a green colour scheme distinct from the province's typical blue and white license plates, these green plates permit BEV and PHEV owners to travel in the province's high-occupancy vehicle (HOV) and travel at no cost in the high-occupancy toll (HOT) lanes, regardless of the number of passengers in the vehicle.

Quebec

All-electric vehicles with high-capacity battery packs were eligible for the full  rebate, and lower incentives were set for low-range electric cars and plug-in hybrids. There was also a ceiling for the maximum number of eligible vehicles: 10,000 for all-electric vehicles and plug-in hybrids, and 5,000 for conventional hybrids.

In November 2013, the provincial government announced its decision to earmark in 2014 an additional  (~ ) to fund a three-year extension to the electric-vehicle rebate program. Quebec's government also set the goal to deploy 12,500 more electric vehicles in the province by 2017, consisting of 10,200 consumer cars, 325 taxis, and 2,000 government-fleet vehicles. Also, incentives were issued for "greening" 525 taxis, aimed to introduce 325 plug-in vehicles (275 plug-in hybrids and 50 all-electrics) and 200 conventional hybrids.

Also in 2013, the provincial government announced it support to deploy 5,000 new charging stations. A total of 500 stations were to be located around various cities and along the province's so-called Electric Circuit route, another 1,000 near government buildings, and 3,500 at various workplaces for employee use. Also the government announced an initiative for the gradual electrification of the provincial government's own vehicle fleet. The goal is to replace vehicles of the provincial government's 34 ministers (cabinet-level officials) with plug-in hybrid or pure electric vehicles by March 2017. The government expects to bring 2,000 plug-in vehicles into the provincial fleet over the same time.

In October 2016, the National Assembly of Quebec passed a new zero emission vehicle legislation that obliges any carmaker who sells in the Canadian province more than 4,500 new vehicles per year over a three-year average, to offer their customers a minimum number of plug-in hybrid and all-electric models. Under the new law, 3.5% of the total number of autos sold by carmakers in Quebec have to be zero emissions vehicles (ZEV) starting in 2018, rising to 15.5% in 2020. A tradable credit system was created for those carmakers not fulfilling their quotas to avoid financial penalties. The quotas will be determined by Quebec's Ministry of Sustainable Development. Quebec became the first Canadian province to pass such legislation, joining ten U.S. states, including California, that have similar ZEV laws. Quebec aims to have 100,000 zero emission vehicles on the road by 2020. Initially, the provincial government set the goal in 2011 to have 300,000 plug-in vehicles on the roads by 2020.

British Columbia

As of June 22, 2019, British Columbia's Clean Energy Vehicle (CEV) Program, funded by the Government of British Columbia and administered by the New Car Dealers of British Columbia industry group, was renewed with funding for approximately 12,000 vehicles. This program will expire when the current 26.5 million in new funding is depleted. The current levels of incentives for vehicles under CA$55,000 are:  for an EV (min 85 km range),  for a plug-in hybrid or an extended range vehicle with a smaller battery capacity (less than 85 km range) these amounts may be reduced annually. All vehicles must be new and purchased in BC, each claim is processed by the dealer at the Point of Sale and deducted from the vehicle price after taxes. The previous program that provided funding to cover part of the cost of installing home EV charging equipment has been discontinued.

There is also a separate privately funded "SCRAP-IT" program with incentives for scrapping conventional gas-powered vehicles. However, there is also the option of applying for a  rebate cheque when buying used EV (min. 15 kWh capacity) and a  rebate cheque when buying a new EV (min. 15 kWh capacity). There is a requirement of 6 months of continuous driving insurance on the vehicle being scrapped from the application date backwards. Incentives are limited yearly (in 2019, there were 1,300 new and 200 used incentives). There is an MSRP limit of CA$77,000. SCRAP-IT also introduced a home charging station program on October 18, 2018, called ZapBC. This program covers the cost of a Level 2 ChargePoint charging station. Applicants must pay taxes on the charging station and installation costs. An estimate is provided once the application is submitted.

Since 2016, PHEV and BEV owners can apply for a special decal which permits access to high-occupancy vehicle lanes regardless of the number of passengers in the vehicle.

Mexico 

Mexico has set a minimum goal of clean energies as part of the electric power generation mix in for the next years (25% in 2018, 30% in 2021 and 35% in 2024) as a strategy to reach Greenhouse Gases (GHG) emission cuts. Energy efficiency is also regarded as one of the greater cost-benefit potential alternatives to achieve GHG reduction. Moreover, the transport sector in Mexico represents 44.7% of the total final consumption of energy, almost 17% more than the world average (28%). Thus, replacing low fuel efficient transport with alternative fuels is regarded as a considerable contribution to reduce 50% of its GHG emissions by the year 2050, as established by the General Law on Climate Change commitments. Therefore, incentives for PHEVs have been created both at regional and federal levels to decrease cost of ownership for the end-consumers.

Minimum fuel efficiency by vehicle class

Federal 
In Mexico, there are several existing incentives regarding Plug-in Hybrid Electric Vehicles (PHEV) at a federal level. Fiscal incentives for end-consumers include higher daily lease tax deductions per car ($285 versus $200 MXN), higher tax deduction caps per car ($250,000 versus $175,000 MXN), and fiscal credits for up to 30% of investments for charging stations located in public places. Furthermore, PHEVs are exempt of the tax on new vehicles (paid by the manufacturer, assembler or dealer).

Also, the electrical power service contract for residential charging stations can be independent of household consumption under a commercial rate, which can save up to 40% on electricity compared to consolidating billing in the same meter.

Regional 
In Mexico City, Mexico State and Jalisco, PHEVs are exempt from vehicular emission verification. They can instead obtain an exempt hologram which unbounds them from the restrictions imposed by the vehicular emission verification programs, which limits car usage. PHEVs are also exempt of the annual ownership vehicle tax in Baja California, Durango, Mexico City, Mexico State, Nayarit, Tlaxcala and Querétaro. In Mexico City, they also have right to a 50% discount on other contributions (permits, concessions, registry, etc.), and models from 2002 to 2017 pay only an endorsement right for vehicle control services. Finally, in Mexico City, PHEVs also have preferential parking in private and public parking lots.

Charging station network 
As of January 2017, in Mexico there were 700 public access charging stations for PHEVs that are privately owned. The Ministry of Energy and the state owned electric power utility, Comision Federal de Electricidad, will destine $25 million MXN to install 100 more charging stations through 2017–2018 in the metropolitan areas of Guadalajara, Monterrey and Mexico City. As of now, users of the existing network can charge their PHEVs for free, as the cost of electricity is absorbed by the owners of the establishments where the charging stations are located.

United States

Federal government 

In his 2011 State of the Union address, President Barack Obama set the goal for the U.S. to become the first country to have one million electric vehicles on the road by 2015. For this purpose, his administration pledged  billion in federal grants to support the development of next-generation electric vehicles and batteries. The funds were allocated as follows: $1.5 billion in grants to U.S.-based manufacturers to produce highly efficient batteries and their components; up to $500 million in grants to U.S.-based manufacturers to produce other components needed for electric vehicles, such as electric motors and other components; and up to $400 million to demonstrate and evaluate plug-in hybrids and other electric infrastructure conceptslike truck stop charging station, electric rail, and training for technicians to build and repair electric vehicles (greencollar jobs).

Considering that actual plug-in car sales were lower than initially expected, as of early 2013, several industry observers have concluded that Obama's one million goal was unattainable. U.S. cumulative plug-in sales since 2008 achieved the 500,000 unit milestone in August 2016. According to a July 2012 study by Pike Research, cumulative sales would reach the one million goal set by the Obama Administration only in 2018, while other analysts agree that the goal could be achieved in 2018. Secretary of Energy, Ernest Moniz, said in January 2016 that the one million goal may not be reached until 2020. According to the Secretary purchases have fallen well below President Barack Obama's goal due to low gasoline prices, which had a negative impact on sales. Also improvements in battery technology are required as lowering battery costs is "absolutely critical" to boost electric vehicle sales.

In March 2018, a group of America's largest electric utilities sided with U.S. automakers and asked Congress to preserve the tax credit in order to support the continued growth of sales of electric vehicles. Currently, there are hundreds of thousands of electric vehicles on the road. However, the auto industry is approaching a point at which the tax incentives will begin to expire. According to Daily Energy Insider, "The utilities' efforts occur at a time when growth in electric sales is sluggish and electric companies see a possible opportunity to apply the latest battery technology to help serve their customers."

New plug-in electric vehicles 

The Energy Improvement and Extension Act of 2008 granted tax credits for new qualified plug-in electric drive motor vehicles. The American Recovery and Reinvestment Act of 2009 (ARRA) also authorized federal tax credits for converted plug-ins, though the credit is lower than for new PEVs. American Clean Energy and Security Act of 2009 (ACES) also had extensive provisions for electric cars. The bill called for all electric utilities to, "develop a plan to support the use of plug-in electric drive vehicles, including heavy-duty hybrid electric vehicles". The bill also provides for "smart grid integration," allowing for more efficient, effective delivery of electricity to accommodate the additional demands of plug-in electric vehicles. Finally, the bill allows for the Department of Energy to fund projects that support the development of PEVs and smart grid technology and infrastructure.

As defined by the 2009 American Recovery and Reinvestment Act, a PEV is a vehicle which draws propulsion energy from a traction battery with at least 4 kWh of capacity and uses an offboard source of energy to recharge such battery. The tax credit for new plug-in electric vehicles is worth $2,500 plus $417 for each kilowatt-hour of battery capacity over 4 kWh, and the portion of the credit determined by battery capacity cannot exceed $5,000. Therefore, the maximum amount of the credit allowed for a new PEV is $7,500. Both the Nissan Leaf electric vehicle and the Chevrolet Volt plug-in hybrid, launched in December 2010, are eligible for the maximum $7,500 tax credit. The Toyota Prius Plug-in Hybrid, released in January 2012, was eligible for a $2,500 tax credit due to its smaller battery capacity of 5.2 kWh. All Tesla cars and Chevrolet Bolts were eligible for the $7,500 tax credit.

As granted by the 2009 ARRA, electric vehicles produced after 2010 are eligible for an IRS tax credit from $2,500 to $7,500. There are some limitations and rules however that go along with the applied tax credit from electric vehicles. When an electric vehicle is leased, the tax credit is held by the manufacturer offering the lease, not by the lessee. Other restrictions that affect PEV tax credit include limitation of credit for electric vehicles used in reselling purposes, terms requiring the vehicle to remain in the United States, and production by qualified sellers.

Phaseout

These granted tax credits on PEV vehicles will phase out once 200,000 plug-in vehicles are sold by each manufacturer in the U.S.  During this phase out period after 200,000 plug-in car sales, qualified producers will experience a drop in a tax credit of $7,500 to $3,750 for the next 6 months followed by a drop to $1,875 for another 6 months until the credit is run out completely.

The qualified plug-in electric vehicle credit phases out for a PEV manufacturer over the one-year period beginning with the second calendar quarter after the calendar quarter in which at least 200,000 qualifying vehicles from that manufacturer have been sold for use in the U.S. Cumulative sales started counting sales after December 31, 2009. After reaching the cap, qualifying PEVs for one quarter still earn the full credit, the second quarter after that quarter PEVS are eligible for 50% of the credit for six months, then 25% of the credit for another six months and finally the credit is phased out.

In July 2018, Tesla Inc. was the first plug-in manufacturer to pass 200,000 sales and the full tax credit was available until the end 2018, with the phase out beginning in January 2019. General Motors combined sales of plug-in electric vehicles passed 200,000 units in November 2018. The full tax credit was available until the end of March 2019 and thereafter reduced gradually until complete phase out beginning on April 1, 2020. , 21 vehicles have access to full tax credit, depending on taxpayer's conditions. Several plugin-vehicles are also approved for significant credits.

Studies
A 2013 study published in the journal Energy Policy determined that current federal subsidies are "not aligned with the goal of decreased gasoline consumption in a consistent and efficient manner." In particular, hybrid-vehicle credit is given according to battery capacity rather than on the vehicle's all-electric range. Across the battery-capacity and charging-infrastructure scenarios examined, the lowest-cost solution is for more drivers to switch to traditional hybrid electrics or low-capacity plug-in hybrid electric vehicles (PHEVs). Installing charging infrastructure would provide lower gasoline savings per dollar spent than paying for increased PHEV battery capacity.

A 2016 study conducted by researchers from the University of California, Davis found that the federal tax credit was the reason behind more than 30% of the plug-in electric sales. The impact of the federal tax incentive is higher among owners of the Nissan Leaf, with up to 49% of sales attributable to the federal incentive. The study, based on a stated preference survey of more than 2,882 plug-in vehicle owners in 11 states, also found that the federal tax credit shifts buyers from internal combustion engine vehicles to plug-in vehicles and advances the purchase timing of new vehicles by a year or more.

Plug-in conversion kits 
The 2009 ARRA provided a tax credit for plug-in electric drive conversion kits. The credit is equal to 10% of the cost of converting a vehicle to a qualified plug-in electric vehicle and in service after February 17, 2009. The maximum amount of the credit is $4,000. The credit does not apply to conversions made after December 31, 2011.

Charging equipment 
Businesses qualified for tax credits up to $50,000 for larger installations.

New proposals 

Two separate initiatives were pursued in 2011 to transform the tax credit into an instant cash rebate; these did not pass. The objective of both initiatives was to make new qualifying plug-in electric cars more accessible to buyers by making the incentive more effective. The rebate would have been available at the point of sale allowing consumers to avoid a wait of up to a year to apply the tax credit against income tax returns. The first initiative was from Senator Debbie Stabenow who reintroduced the "Charging America Forward Act." This bill was introduced in August 2010 but was not voted by the full Senate. The other initiative was from the Obama Administration and was submitted in the FY2012 Budget as a provision to transform the existing credit into a rebate that would have been claimable by dealers and passed along to the consumers, this was not included in the Budget.

Another change plug-in tax credit was proposed by Senator Carl Levin and Representative Sander Levin who proposed to raise the existing cap on the number of plug-in vehicles eligible for the tax credit. The proposal would have raised that limit from the existing 200,000 PEVs per manufacturer to 500,000 units, this was not passed.

The proposal sought to remove the 200,000 vehicle cap per manufacturer after which the credit phases out over a year. Instead, the incentives would begin to phase outfalling to 75% of the current creditstarting in 2019 for all manufacturers, and would be completely phased out by 2022; this did not get included in the Budget.

In November 2017, House Republicans proposed scrapping the $7,500 tax credit as part of a sweeping tax overhaul, but the final bill passed left the credit intact.

In California 

The Clean Vehicle Rebate Project (CVRP), initially funded with a total of  million by the California Environmental Protection Agency's Air Resources Board (ARB), was established in order to promote the production and use of zero-emission vehicles (ZEVs), including plug-in electric and fuel cell vehicles. The program was created from Assembly Bill 118 that was signed by Governor Schwarzenegger in October 2007. The funding is provided on a first-come, first-served basis, and the project is expected to go through 2015.

Eligible vehicles include only new ARB-certified or approved zero-emission or plug-in hybrid electric vehicles.  A list of eligible vehicles can be found on the California Center for Sustainable Energy web site. Among the eligible vehicles are neighborhood electric vehicles, battery electric, plug-in hybrid electric, and fuel cell vehicles including cars, trucks, medium- and heavy-duty commercial vehicles, and zero-emission motorcycles. Vehicles must be purchased or leased on or after March 15, 2010. Rebates of up to $5,000 per light-duty vehicle are available for individuals and business owners who purchase or lease new eligible vehicles. Certain zero-emission commercial vehicles are also eligible for rebates up to $20,000.

As of early September 2012, private individuals accounted for 88% of rebate funds reimbursed. As of early March 2013, CARB has issued about 18,000 rebates totaling  million. However, CARB notices that approximately 2,300 Chevrolet Volts were sold in California before the Volt became eligible for the rebate in February 2012. As a result of the rebate and other existing incentives, such as allowing solo drivers in HOV lanes, California is the leading PEV market in the United States with about 40% of all new plug-in electric vehicles sold nationwide during 2011 and 2012, while the state represents about 10% of all new car sales in the country.

, a total of 52,264 clean vehicle rebates have been issued by the CVRP, for a total of  disbursed, with only  remaining for fiscal year 2013–2014. , the CVRP was facing an estimated  funding shortfall for the 2013-14 fiscal year, and uncertainty about additional funding for the 2014-15 fiscal year. CARB staff presented a proposal to the board to overcome the funding shortage and also to facilitate the rebates to benefit buyers in disadvantaged communities who live in areas with bad air quality or who can't afford high-end electric cars.

A bill signed into law in September 2014, mandated the CARB to draft a financial plan to meet California's goal of putting one million vehicles on the road while making sure that disadvantaged communities can participate. CARB had to change the Clean Vehicle Rebate program to provide an extra credit for low-income drivers who wish to purchase or lease an electric car. CARB also provides assistance to carsharing programs in low-income neighborhoods and install charging stations in apartment buildings in those communities. Under bill SB 1275, low-income residents who agree to scrap older, polluting cars will also get a clean vehicle rebate on top of existing payments for junking smog-producing vehicles.

Another bill signed into law in September 2014, AB 1721, grants clean air vehicles free or reduced rates in high-occupancy toll lanes (HOT) lanes. AB 2565 facilitates access to charging stations by requiring commercial and residential property owners to approve installation if the charging station meets requirements and complies with the owner's process for approving a modification to the property.

, California added income-based caps to its rebate system. As of March 2016, the Center for Sustainable Energy has issued more than $291 million in the CVRP for over 137,200 vehicles since 2010.

The income-base caps went into effect on 1 November 2016. These limits do not apply to the purchase of fuel cell electric vehicles, which represent less than 1% of rebate applications.

The standard tax credits (on eligible cars) are $1,500 for plug-in hybrids, $2,500 for all-electrics, and $5,000 for fuel cell cars.

Access to HOV lanes

In California a vehicle that meets specified emissions standards may be issued Clean Air Vehicle (CAV) decals that allow the vehicle to be operated by a single occupant in California's high-occupancy vehicle lanes (HOV), or carpool or diamond lanes. All-electric vehicles are classified as Federal Inherently Low Emission Vehicles (ILEVs), and as zero emissions vehicles are entitled to an unlimited number of white CAV stickers. Green CAV stickers were initially available to a limited number of applicants that purchased or leased cars meeting California's Enhanced Advanced Technology Partial Zero Emission Vehicle (Enhanced AT PZEV) or Transitional Zero-Emission Vehicle (TZEV) requirements, for which plug-in hybrids classify. The green car sticker cap was increased several times, and since September 2016 the cap was removed.

Research performed in 2015 by the UCLA Luskin Center for Innovation found that access to HOV lanes has a significant impact on plug-in car sales. Researchers linked automobile sales to a sample of more than 7,000 of the 8,057 census tracts in California for the study, including Los Angeles, Sacramento, San Diego and San Francisco. The study concluded that the ability to use potentially time-saving HOV lanes prompted the purchase of more than 24,000 plug-in electric cars and hybrids in the four urban areas from 2010 to 2013, or about 40% of the total of such vehicles. The UCLA researcher concluded that without the policy giving plug-in vehicles access to HOV lanes, total plug-in sales in the same study areas would have been only 36,692 for the three-year period.

All states 

, 37 states and Washington, D.C., had established incentives and tax exemptions for BEVs and PHEVs, or utility-rate breaks, and other non-monetary incentives such as free parking and high-occupancy vehicle lane access. All states are eligible for the $7,500 income tax credit.

Oceania

Australia

Federal incentives 
An Australian National Electric Vehicle Strategy is set to be released by mid 2021 by the Federal coalition government.

Fuel efficient vehicles attract less Luxury Car Tax, leading to a saving of up to $2,648. In 2021, the Luxury Car Tax threshold is $69,152 for fuel efficient vehicles and $79,659 for full electric vehicles BEVs. However, Australia's largest states of Victoria and New South Wales, and the ACT, are exempt from the Luxury Car Tax. The Federal Government has also committed to an industry-wide review of petrol and diesel standards in 2021. Euro 6 petrol and diesel standards are currently planned nationally in 2024.

The Federal Government pledged to spend $74.5 million on charging infrastructure in the budget in 2021. The Federal Government is also contributing $15 million to a national electric vehicle charging network built by Evie Networks and connecting Melbourne, Canberra, Sydney, Adelaide and Brisbane.

A Federal Government target for 100% of car sales to be electric vehicles before 2050 could also be included in the Federal Government's National Electric Vehicle Strategy. This is due to the Prime Minister stating in 2021 that the government’s goal is to reach net zero emissions by 2050, which would require a national transition to 100% electric vehicles before 2050. Moreover, 60% of Australians support a nationwide ban on petrol and diesel car sales by 2035.

State and Territory incentives
State government's offer significant electric vehicle incentives to ensure they meet their EV sales targets. Victoria aim for 50% of new car sales to be electric vehicles by 2030. The South Australian government also aim for 100% of new car sales to be electric vehicles by 2035. The NSW Government is also considering an official ban date for the sale of petrol and diesel vehicles.

Victoria 
Victoria offers a subsidy of $3,000 - $5,000 for BEV cars under $68,740. Victorian EV, PHEV and hybrid drivers also pay a reduced rate of stamp duty and $100 off registration fees. Victoria's peak infrastructure advisory body recommended the removal of registration fees altogether for electric vehicles Victoria aim for 50% of new car sales to be electric vehicles/FCEVs by 2030. Ban of internal combustion-engine vehicles advised by peak infrastructure advisory body This will be presented to the Victorian Government in mid-2021

Victoria has created a $5 million innovation fund to increase commercial EV uptake A $3,000 BEV car rebate is available for 2 vehicles only per company. $46 million ZEV subsidy program, the first of its type in Australia, providing grants to people and businesses wanting to buy ZEVs, targeted at the supply of low to medium-priced vehicles. $5 million commercial sector ZEV Innovation Fund to encourage the uptake of ZEV light commercial vehicles in the commercial passenger vehicle, logistics, construction and service-sector industries. Police fleet will be 100% electric by 2029

All vehicles in Victoria are exempt from the Luxury Car Tax.

In 2021, Victoria introduced the world's first EV tax, charged as road user charges.  Drivers pay 2c per km for PHEV, and 2.5c per km for BEV, paid annually upon registration renewal. This has been cited as the worst EV in the world and made Victoria the laughing stock of the EV community globally

Australian Capital Territory 
ACT offers $15,000 interest free loans. ACT BEVs are also stamp duty exempt and there is a 20% reduction in registration fees with the first 2 years of registration free EVs exempt from stamp duty until June 2024 (new and second-hand EVs) Free registration available to converted EV's also (worth up to $1,200). ACT committed to allowing EVs to drive in transit lanes until 2023

Class B, C and D Green Vehicles pay reduced stamp duty.

All vehicles in ACT are exempt from the Luxury Car Tax.

South Australia 
The South Australian Liberal government aim for 100% of new car sales to be electric vehicles by 2035

South Australian Government will contribute $5,000 or 50% towards residential and commercial EV charger purchases and installations Also 100% discounted parking for EVs. Taxis to be 100% electric vehicles by 2030 Ride share fleet to be 100% electric vehicles by 2030

New South Wales 
New South Wales offer $250 discount from registration fees and NSW plan stamp duty exemption for EVs saving $1,200 - $18,000 NSW plan to allow EVs in transit lane. NSW plan to subsidize parking. Ban of internal combustion-engine vehicles planned in NSW.

All vehicles in NSW are exempt from the Luxury Car Tax.

Tasmania 
EVs exempt from stamp duty until 2023. Car rental companies exempt from registration fees on new and used EVs Tasmania offer grants for public and business electric charging stations.

Queensland 
EVs pay $660 less stamp duty than other vehicles Queensland electric and hybrid vehicles pay a lower stamp duty of 2 per cent. 50% discounted parking for EVs.

Northern Territory 
NT EVs only pay the small car category for registration ($665.55 a year) irrelevant of size

New Zealand 

In June 2021, the New Zealand government announced a "feebate" scheme, by which electric vehicles would be subsidised, while particularly high-emitting ICE vehicles would have a cost added to them. The scheme is intended to be revenue-neutral, so that the fees on high-emitting vehicles would pay for the rebates on electric ones. The rebate system began operation on 1 July 2021, with the fee part originally intended to begin on 1 January 2022 (although this has since been delayed to 1 April 2022). This came after a 2019 proposal for a feebate was seemingly vetoed by the minority coalition member New Zealand First.

26,000 EVs were registered in New Zealand in 2020 and the government have a target of an additional 60,000 electric vehicles on New Zealand roads by 2023.

All government vehicles and the national bus fleet are required to be electric in the future with New Zealand mandating that all government agencies must only purchase electric vehicles in 2020 to ensure one-third of the fleet is electric by 2023.

South America

Ecuador
In Ecuador, all electric vehicles are exempt from customs duties and taxes starting in June 2019. The electric vehicle offer in the country is set to increase. The Ecuadorean government has been incentivizing the use of electric vehicles with tax cuts. However, both the offer and demand remained short, encouraging the government to eliminate all duties to electric vehicles.

Africa

Morocco
Electric and hybrid vehicles are exempt from customs duties since 2017.

South Africa
Electric vehicles pay a 25% duty, this is 7% higher than fossil fuel vehicles from the EU that only pay 18%.  Beyond this disincentive, there are no incentives or advantages for EV ownership in South Africa.

See also
 Electric car use by country
 Phase-out of fossil fuel vehicles
 Government incentives for fuel efficient vehicles in the United States
 Hybrid tax credit
 List of modern production plug-in electric vehicles
 Plug In America

References

External links
 Clean Vehicle Rebate Project website 
 Driving Electrification – A Global Comparison of Fiscal Incentive Policy for Electric Vehicles,  International Council on Clean Transportation, May 2014
 Effects of Federal Tax Credits for the Purchase of Electric Vehicles Congressional Budget Office, September 2012
 Evaluating the Impact of High Occupancy Vehicle (HOV) Lane Access on Plug-In Vehicles (PEVs) Purchasing and Usage in California, University of California, Davis, Working Paper UCD-ITS-WP-14-01, April 2014
 Federal and State Laws and Incentives for alternative fuels and vehicles, Alternative Fuels Data Center, U.S. Department of Energy
 List of U.S. Electric Vehicle and EVSE Incentives by State, September 2014
 New Energy Tax Credits for Electric Vehicles purchased in 2009
 Overview of Tax Incentives for Electrically Chargeable Vehicles in the E.U.
 Plug-in Tracker: A comprehensive list of highway-capable PEVs (cars and trucks, 2- and 3-wheeled and commercial vehicles)
 UK Plug-in Car Grant website
 U.S. Federal & State Incentives & Laws
 State and Federal Incentives for EVs, PHEVs and Charge Stations – State and Federal Incentives – United States Incentives Map, Plug In America
 US Tax Incentives for Plug-in Hybrids and Electric Cars
 UK website for government ev grant claims
 Akaki Mamaladze on production of first electric cars in Caucasus: "Our childhood dreams come true" – Interview of A. Mamaladze, director of AIProduction, for Caucasian Journal

Electric vehicle conversion
Electric vehicle industry
Plug-in hybrid vehicles
Renewable energy policy
Subsidies
Taxation in the United Kingdom
Taxation in the United States